This article is a list of seasons completed by the New Orleans Saints American football franchise of the National Football League (NFL).

Seasons

1 Due to a strike-shortened season in 1982, all teams were ranked by conference instead of division.

References

 

 
New Orleans Saints
seasons